Jurata is a settlement and seaside resort in northern Poland, located on the Hel Peninsula in a forested area between the towns of Jastarnia and Hel in Puck County, Pomeranian Voivodeship, on the coast of the Baltic Sea.

History
Jurata was established in the interwar period (1928) as a Polish sea side resort, popular especially among Varsovians. Its name comes from the Lithuanian Goddess Jūratė which in Polish is spelled as Jurata. During the German occupation of Poland (World War II), several Poles from Hel were enslaved as forced labour to serve new German colonists in Jurata.

Gallery

See also 
Hel Peninsula

References

External links 

 www.chalupy.pl
 

Villages in Puck County
1928 establishments in Poland
Populated places established in 1928
Populated coastal places in Poland
Seaside resorts in Poland